Diktariškiai Manor is a former residential manor in Diktariškiai village, Radviliškis District Municipality.

History
Pranciškus Šemeta, one of the commanders of the November Uprising, was born in the Diktariškiai Manor in 1802.

References

Manor houses in Lithuania
Classicism architecture in Lithuania